Andrew Manepora (born 1 December 1967) is a politician of Solomon Islands who served as Deputy Speakers of the National Parliament of the Solomon Islands.

References

Solomon Islands politicians
Members of the National Parliament of the Solomon Islands
Deputy Speakers of the National Parliament of the Solomon Islands
1967 births
Living people